Petra Starčević (born 7 May 1987 in Rijeka) is a retired Croatian biathlete. At the 2006 Winter Olympics in Turin she finished 79th at the 2006 Winter Olympics sprint event and 79th in the individual event.

References

External links
 Petra STARCEVIC at biathlonresults.com

1987 births
Sportspeople from Rijeka
Croatian female biathletes
Living people
Biathletes at the 2006 Winter Olympics
Olympic biathletes of Croatia